Arnljot Nyaas (14 May 1916 – 16 July 1995) was a Norwegian cross-country skier who competed in the early 1950s. He won a bronze medal in the 18 km event at the 1950 FIS Nordic World Ski Championships in Lake Placid, New York.

Cross-country skiing results
All results are sourced from the International Ski Federation (FIS).

World Championships

 1 medal – (1 bronze)

References

External links

Norwegian male cross-country skiers
1916 births
1995 deaths
FIS Nordic World Ski Championships medalists in cross-country skiing